Arthur James Edward Child,  (May 19, 1910 – July 30, 1996) was a Canadian businessman and former chairman and chief executive officer of Burns Foods Limited of Calgary. Arthur James Edward Child and his business partner Ron Jackson acquired the food processing and distribution company in a leveraged management buyout in 1986. With sales in excess of $1 billion, Burns Foods was involved in meat processing, dairy, food warehousing and distribution, and vegetable processing businesses. Over a 12-year period, Arthur James Edward Child and his management team built Burns Foods into a leading Canadian food company with over $1 billion in annual sales. Beginning in 1995, a majority of the Burns Foods' subsidiaries were sold generating an exceptional return to the shareholders.

Born in Guildford, England, he earned a Bachelor of Commerce in 1931 from Queen's University. After working in the food industry, he received a Master of Arts in economics from the University of Toronto.

In 1985, he was made an Officer of the Order of Canada.

References
[1] Canada West Foundation profile

External links
 Arthur James Edward Child at The Canadian Encyclopedia

1910 births
1996 deaths
20th-century Canadian businesspeople
Officers of the Order of Canada
People from Guildford
Queen's University at Kingston alumni
British emigrants to Canada